Dimitrije "Mita" Ruvarac (Stari Banovci, Austria Hungary October 25, 1842 — Sremski Karlovci, Kingdom of Yugoslavia December 16, 1931) was Serbian historian, Orthodox priest, academic and publisher. He is known for being one of the most active publishers of his time. Ruvarac family immigrated to Syrmia in Austria-Hungary, today in Serbia, from the region between Bihać and Cazin, nowadays Bosnia and Herzegovina, then Ottoman Empire. German historian Leopold von Ranke was among the scholars who influenced Dimitrije Ruvarac the most.

Selected works 
 Pozivi I Odzivi Ili Radnja Pojedinih Srpskih Arhiepiskopa U Mitropoliji Karlovackoj, Oko Podizanja Srpskih Škola I Stvaranja Fondova za njihovo izdržavanje, (1894) Zemun, Štamparija Jove Karamata
 
 
 Postanak i razvitak srpske crkvenonarodne avtonomije (1899)
 Srpska Mitropolija Karlovačka oko polovine XVIII veka (1902)
 Opis Srpskih Fruškogorskih Manastira 1753 God., (1903), Sremski Karlovci
 Istorija Patrijaršijske biblioteke (1919)
 Nacrt života i spisak književnih radova mitropolita Stratimirovića (1921)

References

External links 
 Biography of Dimitrije Ruvarac on the web site of "Pravoslavlje"

1842 births
1931 deaths
People from Stara Pazova
20th-century Serbian historians
19th-century Serbian historians